Sarisophora chlaenota is a moth in the family Lecithoceridae. It was described by Edward Meyrick in 1904. It is found in Australia, where it has been recorded from New South Wales.

The forewings are bronzy fuscous, much suffused with dark ashy fuscous, with a few scattered black scales. The stigmata are black and very undefined, the plical indefinitely elongate. The hindwings are pale ochreous yellow, the terminal half dark fuscous.

References

Moths described in 1904
Sarisophora